The coats of arms of the Holy See and Vatican City in the form that combines two crossed keys and a tiara used as a coat of arms of the Holy See have origins attested from the 14th century. The combination of one gold and one silver key is a somewhat later development.

The coat of arms of Vatican City, a sovereign entity established by the Lateran Treaty of 11 February 1929, was adopted by the Fundamental Law of the new state on 7 June 1929, and has its coat of arms defined by law as having the silver key in bend and the gold key in bend sinister.

For decades after the creation of Vatican City State, the arrangement of the keys in the Holy See's coat of arms as described in these sources distinguishes it from that of Vatican City State by a reversing of the gold and silver keys. However, such form of the coat of arms has not been used by the Holy See for decades: in all official events and in the diplomatic missions of the Holy See abroad, it is always the regular Vatican City flag (with the gold key pointing upwards to the right and the silver key pointing upwards to the left) that is flown, and the Vatican now only uses the Holy See's coat of arms in monochrome, which renders it, in practice, one and the same as the coat of arms of Vatican City.

Origins and background
Ecclesiastical heraldry had the same origin and developed contemporaneously with general heraldry, which had become general throughout England, France, Italy and Germany by the end of the 12th century. Ecclesiastical heraldry appears first in seals, nearly all vesica-shaped.

When Pope Gregory IX waged war against Emperor Frederick II in 1228, papal troops were described by Richard of San Germano as "bearing the sign of the keys" (clavigeros hostes or clavesignati). The keys appeared on their banners and were sewn onto their clothing over their breasts. The conflict is consequently called War of the Keys.

Keys and their arrangement 
The earliest blazoning of the arms of the Holy See is that found in Froissart's Chronicles of 1353, which describes them as "gules two keys in saltire argent". From the beginning of the 14th century, the arms of the Holy See had shown this arrangement of two crossed keys, most often with a gold key in bend and a silver in bend sinister, but sometimes with both keys or (gold), less often both keys silver, as described by Froissart.

The practice by which the gold key is placed in bend and the silver in bend sinister was slow in establishing itself, and only from the time of Pope Pius II is it found with certainty. "The practice of placing a gold key in bend over another in bend sinister of silver is not found with any certainty before the time of Pius II (1458–64)."

In 1952–1953 the English Heraldry Society gave the blazon of the arms of the Holy See as "Gules a key or [("gold" in French)] in bend above a key argent [("silver" in French)] in bend sinister, both wards upwards, the bows united by a cord or, above the shield a tiara, its three crowns or [("gold")], the mitre argent  [("silver")].". In his 1978 book, Heraldry in the Catholic Church, Archbishop Bruno Heim described the same arrangement.

The arrangement of the keys in the Holy See's coat of arms as was described in these sources distinguished it from that of Vatican City State by a reversing of the gold and silver keys.

However, the Holy See authorities have all but ceased to use the distinct coat of arms that theoretically represented the Holy See – in all official events and including diplomatic missions of the Holy See abroad, it is always the regular Vatican City flag, with the golden key pointing upwards to the right (and the silver key pointing upwards to the left), that is flown.

The Vatican itself now only uses the Holy See coat of arms in monochrome, which makes it indistinguishable from the coat of arms of Vatican City.

Sede vacante

The gold key is placed in bend also in the sede vacante emblem, with the tiara replaced by an umbraculum (umbrella) said to represent the absence of a pope and the temporary governance of the Camerlengo of the Holy Roman Church over the temporal affairs of the Holy See, and in the arms of the Papal States.

Tiara 
By the end of Froissart's 14th century the papal tiara was included in the coat of arms of the Holy See according to Galbreath and Insegne e simboli: araldica pubblica e privata medievale e moderna. Claudio Ceresa, on the other hand, says the earliest known evidence of its adoption dates from the following century, in the pontificate of Martin V (1417–1431).

Papal States

The distinction between the coat of arms of the papacy and that of the territory ruled by it dates back at least to the 16th century. Galbreath states: "From the 16th century on, this, the third coat of the Papacy — which may be blazoned Gules a pair of keys crossed in saltire, one gold, one silver, tied gold, surmounted by a tiara silver, crowned gold — is taken to represent the Papacy as distinct from the Papal States." This statement is quoted with approval by Heim.

The arms of the Papal States differed in having the umbraculum (the emblem of the Pope's temporal powers) in place of the tiara, and were incorporated as the first quartering of the royal coat of arms of the Napoleonic Kingdom of Italy (1805–1814). This coat of arms was not resumed for the territory over which the Pope's temporal powers were restored in 1929 with the creation of Vatican City State.

The holder of the title of Gonfalonier of the Church was entitled to include in his own arms the same design of the crossed keys and umbraculum on a red field.

Vatican City State

The coat of arms of Vatican City State is officially described, under the heading "Annex B. Official coat of arms of Vatican City State", in article 20 of the Fundamental Law of Vatican City State in force since 22 February 2001, which repeats the contents of article 19 of the original Fundamental Law of Vatican City State adopted on 7 June 1929 with immediate effect. Each of these official documents includes an illustration of the coat of arms of the state accompanied by the words "Chiavi decussate sormontate dal triregno in campo rosso" ("Crossed keys beneath the papal tiara on a red field") and is accompanied by an illustration that depicts the keys as two in number, one white (argent) in bend and one golden (or) in bend sinister, interlaced at their intersection with a red (gules) cord. The tiara is represented as white with golden crowns.

Charges on the escutcheon
Claudio Ceresa says that the oldest known representation of the crossed keys beneath the papal tiara dates from the pontificate of Martin V (1417–1431), whose successor, Eugene IV (1431–1447), included it in the design of a silver coin. Galbreath and Insegne e simboli: araldica pubblica e privata medievale e moderna say it is attested from the previous century.

The keys
The keys refer to the promise of Jesus Christ to Peter, "I will entrust to you the keys of the kingdom of heaven. Whatever you declare bound on earth shall be bound in heaven; whatever you declare loosed on earth shall be loosed in heaven." They are a symbol of the power the Catholic Church believes that Christ gave to Saint Peter and his successors, with the gold key signifying that the power reaches to heaven and the silver key that it extends to all the faithful on earth, the interlacing indicating the linking between the two aspects of the power, and the handles of the key being at the base to symbolize the power being in the hands of the pope.

The tiara
While actual wearing of the papal tiara has been discontinued by John Paul I and his successors, it remains a papal heraldic symbol. A crown was added to the headgear of the Pope in 1130 to symbolize sovereignty over the Papal States. In 1301, Boniface VIII, at that time in conflict with Philip IV of France, added a second crown to indicate that his spiritual authority was superior to any civil power. In 1342, Benedict XII added a third crown to symbolize the superiority of papal religious authority over that of non-religious monarchs. The original significance of the three crowns was lost over time and they came to represent instead the pope's powers as priest, ruler and teacher.

See also
 Flag of Vatican City
 Fundamental Law of Vatican City State
 Holy See
 Vatican City
 Index of Vatican City-related articles

References

Further reading 
 Donald L. Galbreath: Papal Heraldry. Cambridge, 1930; Heffer and Sons.
 Bruno Bernhard Heim: Heraldry in the Catholic Church: Its Origins, Customs and Laws. Gerrards Cross: Van Duren, 1978.
 Baron du Roure de Paulin: L'Héraldique Ecclésiastique. Paris, 1911; H. Daragon.

External links 

 Holy See Press Office—State of Vatican City Flag, Coat of Arms and Seal (official site)
 Text of the Fundamental Law of Vatican City State, including a reproduction of Annex B depicting the coat of arms of the state
 Papal Heraldry

Government of Vatican City
Vatican City
Vatican heraldry
Holy See
Holy See
Holy See
Christian symbols
Holy See